Anbaran (also Romanized as ‘Anbarān) is a city in Anbaran District of Namin County, Ardabil province, Iran. At the 2006 census, its population was 6,161 in 1,532 households. The following census in 2011 counted 6,084 people in 1,783 households. The latest census in 2016 showed a population of 5,757 people in 1,770 households.

References 

Namin County

Cities in Ardabil Province

Towns and villages in Namin County

Populated places in Ardabil Province

Populated places in Namin County